Michel Braun (10 March 1930 – 4 November 2021) was a Luxembourgian sports shooter. He competed at the 1972 Summer Olympics and the 1976 Summer Olympics. Braun died on 4 November 2021, at the age of 91.

References

External links
 

1930 births
2021 deaths
Luxembourgian male sport shooters
Olympic shooters of Luxembourg
Shooters at the 1972 Summer Olympics
Shooters at the 1976 Summer Olympics
People from Grevenmacher (canton)